This is a list of 105 species in Tetraloniella, a genus of long-horned bees in the family Apidae.

Tetraloniella species

 Tetraloniella abessinica (Friese, 1915) i c g
 Tetraloniella abrochia Eardley, 1989 i c g
 Tetraloniella albata (Cresson, 1872) i c g b
 Tetraloniella alboscopacea (Friese, 1909) i c g
 Tetraloniella alticincta (Lepeletier, 1841) i c g
 Tetraloniella apicalis (Friese, 1905) i c g
 Tetraloniella arizonica (Cockerell, 1937) i c
 Tetraloniella ataxia Eardley, 1989 i c g
 Tetraloniella aurantiflava Eardley, 1989 i c g
 Tetraloniella auricauda (LaBerge, 1970) i c g
 Tetraloniella ayala LaBerge, 2001 i c g
 Tetraloniella balluca LaBerge, 2001 i c g
 Tetraloniella bottandieri (Alfken, 1914) i c g
 Tetraloniella braunsiana (Friese, 1905) i c g
 Tetraloniella brevifellator (LaBerge, 1957) i c g
 Tetraloniella brevikeraia Eardley, 1989 i c g
 Tetraloniella brevipennis (Cameron, 1898) i c g
 Tetraloniella brooksi Eardley, 1989 i c g
 Tetraloniella cacuminis LaBerge, 2001 i c g
 Tetraloniella capensis (Lepeletier, 1841) i c g
 Tetraloniella cinctella (Saunders, 1908) i c g
 Tetraloniella crenulaticornis (Cockerell, 1898) i c g
 Tetraloniella cressoniana (Cockerell, 1905) i c g
 Tetraloniella davidsoni (Cockerell, 1905) i c
 Tetraloniella dentata (Germar, 1839) i c g
 Tetraloniella distata LaBerge, 2001 i c g
 Tetraloniella donata (Cresson, 1878) i c g
 Tetraloniella elsei Eardley, 1989 i c g
 Tetraloniella eriocarpi (Cockerell, 1898) i c g b
 Tetraloniella fasciata (LaBerge, 1970) i c g
 Tetraloniella fasciatella (LaBerge, 1970) i c
 Tetraloniella fastigiata LaBerge, 2001 i c g
 Tetraloniella flagellicornis (Smith, 1879) i c g
 Tetraloniella flavifasciata (Cockerell, 1949) i c g
 Tetraloniella flaviscopa (Hedicke, 1933) i c g
 Tetraloniella friesei (Meade-Waldo, 1914) i c g
 Tetraloniella fulvescens (Giraud, 1863) i c g
 Tetraloniella fulvicornis Morawitz g
 Tetraloniella fulvotecta (Cockerell, 1949) i c g
 Tetraloniella glabricornis (Cameron, 1908) i c g
 Tetraloniella graja (Eversmann, 1852) i c g
 Tetraloniella helianthorum (Cockerell, 1914) i c g
 Tetraloniella hohmanni (Tkalcu, 1993) i c g
 Tetraloniella holli (Alfken, 1914) i c g
 Tetraloniella iberica Dusmet y Alonso, 1926 g
 Tetraloniella imitatrix (Cockerell & Porter, 1899) i c g
 Tetraloniella incana LaBerge, 2001 i c g
 Tetraloniella inermis (Friese, 1911) i c g
 Tetraloniella inulae (Tkalcu, 1979) i c g
 Tetraloniella jaliscoensis LaBerge, 2001 i c g
 Tetraloniella julliani (Pérez, 1879) i c g
 Tetraloniella junodi (Friese, 1909) i c g
 Tetraloniella karooensis (Brauns, 1926) i c g
 Tetraloniella katangensis (Cockerell, 1930) i c g
 Tetraloniella keiseri (Benoist, 1962) i c g
 Tetraloniella lanzarotensis (Tkalcu, 1993) i c g
 Tetraloniella lippiae (Cockerell, 1904) i c b
 Tetraloniella longifellator (LaBerge, 1957) i c g
 Tetraloniella lyncea (Mocsáry, 1879) i c g
 Tetraloniella madecassa (Benoist, 1962) i c g
 Tetraloniella michaelseni (Friese, 1916) i c g
 Tetraloniella michoacanensis LaBerge, 2001 i c g
 Tetraloniella minuta (Friese, 1905) i c g
 Tetraloniella minuticornis (Friese, 1905) i c g
 Tetraloniella minutilla LaBerge, 2001 i c g
 Tetraloniella nana (Morawitz, 1874) i c g
 Tetraloniella nanula (Cockerell, 1932) i c g
 Tetraloniella nigricans (Cockerell, 1932) i c g
 Tetraloniella nigriceps (Morawitz, 1895) i c
 Tetraloniella noguera LaBerge, 2001 i c g
 Tetraloniella nostra (Cockerell, 1933) i c g
 Tetraloniella nursei Cockerell, 1922 i c g
 Tetraloniella nyassana (Strand, 1911) i c g
 Tetraloniella ochraea LaBerge, 2001 i c g
 Tetraloniella ogilviae (Cockerell, 1935) i c g
 Tetraloniella ottiliensis (Friese, 1905) i c g
 Tetraloniella pachysoma (Cockerell, 1920) i c g
 Tetraloniella paenalbata LaBerge, 2001 i c g
 Tetraloniella paulyi Eardley, 2001 i c g
 Tetraloniella pennata LaBerge, 2001 i c g
 Tetraloniella perconcinna (Cockerell, 1949) i c g
 Tetraloniella pomonae (Cockerell, 1915) i c g b
 Tetraloniella ruficornis (Fabricius, 1804) i c g
 Tetraloniella salicariae (Lepeletier, 1841) i c g
 Tetraloniella salviae (LaBerge, 1989) i c g
 Tetraloniella scabiosae (Mocsáry, 1881) i c g
 Tetraloniella sierranila Eardley, 1989 i c g
 Tetraloniella silacea LaBerge, 2001 i c g
 Tetraloniella simpsoni (Meade-Waldo, 1914) i c g
 Tetraloniella sjoestedti (Friese, 1909) i c g
 Tetraloniella snizeki (Tkalcu, 2003) i c g
 Tetraloniella sphaeralceae LaBerge, 2001 i c g
 Tetraloniella spissa (Cresson, 1872) i c g
 Tetraloniella strigata (Lepeletier, 1841) i c g
 Tetraloniella tenuifasciata (Friese, 1911) i c
 Tetraloniella tethepa Eardley, 2001 i c g
 Tetraloniella trabeata LaBerge, 2001 i c g
 Tetraloniella trimera (Risch, 2001) i c g
 Tetraloniella vandykei LaBerge, 2001 i c g
 Tetraloniella vansoni (Cockerell, 1935) i c g
 Tetraloniella viator (Cockerell, 1911) i c g
 Tetraloniella watmoughi Eardley, 1989 i c g
 Tetraloniella whiteheadi Eardley, 1989 i c g
 Tetraloniella wilmattae (Cockerell, 1917) i c g
 Tetraloniella yanega LaBerge, 2001 i c g

Data sources: i = ITIS, c = Catalogue of Life, g = GBIF, b = Bugguide.net

References

Tetraloniella
Articles created by Qbugbot